Martine Batchelor (born 1953), a former Jogye Buddhist nun, is the author of several books on Buddhism currently residing in France. She and her husband, Stephen Batchelor, work mostly in the United Kingdom and occasionally in the United States. In addition to writing books, she leads meditation groups with her husband that incorporate aspects of Zen, vipassanā, and Tibetan Buddhism. Batchelor also blogs frequently for the U.S.-based Tricycle: The Buddhist Review. She studied Jogye Zen Buddhism for ten years at Songgwangsa with her former teacher Master Kusan Sunim, being ordained as a nun in 1975. Batchelor served as Kusan's interpreter on speaking tours of the United States and Europe from 1981 to 1985, the year she left monastic life, married Stephen Batchelor, and returned to Europe. There she became a member of Sharpham North Community and served as a guiding teacher at Gaia House, both of which are based in Devon, England. She has also led a Buddhist studies program at Sharpham College in Totnes, Devon.  MB speaks English, Korean, and French and can read Chinese characters.

Bibliography

See also
Korean Seon
Songgwangsa
Buddhism in Europe
Christopher Titmuss
Women in Buddhism

Notes

References

External links
Official website
Official Bio
Martine's Tricycle blog
Dharma talks
Martine article on meditation
Martine article on building community

1953 births
Living people
Buddhism in Korea
Zen Buddhism writers
French scholars of Buddhism
French Buddhist nuns
British Zen Buddhists
French Zen Buddhists
Buddhist nuns
20th-century Buddhist nuns
20th-century French women